Sragen Football Club (also known as Sragen United) was an Indonesian football team based in Sragen, Central Java. Sragen FC played at Liga 2 Indonesia. Sragen FC previously named Laga FC, after a businessman Sragen, Indika Wijaya Kusuma buy Laga FC of PT Laga Nusantara Mandiri worth IDR 5 billion, Laga FC switch homebase to Sragen, and changed its name to Sragen United at February 27, 2017.

History

Laga FC
Laga FC playing at the professional level Liga Indonesia Premier Division after promotion from Liga Nusantara 2014. At the beginning of the Laga FC containing the majority of players - players East Java Pra PON contingent. When appearing in the Liga Indonesia Premier Division, Laga FC coached, Uston Nawawi under the leadership of Chairman Dr. Wardi Azhari Siagian. Accomplishments ever achieved for the name Laga FC is a runners-up Liga Nusantara 2014. When he was named Laga FC, the club is well known as a nomadic club in the face of 2016 Indonesia Soccer Championship B. The club had suffered some embarrassing things related homebase, including failing to hold the inaugural match of counter Persik Kediri May 1, 2016, in Stadium Merdeka, Jombang. There are at least three (3) the city which is the home base in one season by Laga FC, namely Surabaya, Jombang, and Kota Batu. The last time Laga FC match live at the stadium Brantas, Kota Batu.

Sragen FC
Shares of Laga FC purchased by the Sragen employer, Indika Wijaya Kusuma with IDR 5 billion from PT Nusantara Mandiri Laga. With the club he bought stock, then the future of the club is no longer nomads such as competition 2016 Indonesia Soccer Championship B, which should move the city. With the turn of the united Sragen name into the club will make Sragen as their homebase in Liga 2 this season.

Stadium
Taruna Stadium chosen as their homebase to face any opponent there.

Honours
 Liga Nusantara
 Runner-up :2014

References

Football clubs in Indonesia
Football clubs in Central Java
Association football clubs established in 2017